Bad Asses (also known as Bad Ass 2: Bad Asses) is a 2014 American action film starring Danny Trejo and Danny Glover, written and directed by Craig Moss. The film is a sequel to the 2012 film Bad Ass, and was released on DVD during spring 2014.

Plot synopsis

Since we last saw Frank, he followed his dream and opened a Community Center in East Los Angeles where he mentors young boxers, not only in the ring, but in life. He often visits a liquor store run by a former hockey player, Bernie Pope. When his prized student, Manny, gets in over his head with a bad crowd and winds up dead, Frank and Bernie team up, finding themselves ensnared in one life-threatening predicament after another. Forced to escape using the only weapons they have – their wits and their fists – they must survive the onslaught of fury that is brought upon them and Frank's new found love from a high powered, politically connected foe, Leandro (Andrew Divoff).

Cast
 Danny Trejo as Frank Vega
 Danny Glover as Bernie Pope
 Andrew Divoff as Leandro Herrera
 Jacqueline Obradors as Rosaria Parkes
 Charlie Carver as Eric
 Patrick Fabian as Officer Malark
 Jonathan Lipnicki as "Hammer"
 Leon Thomas III as Tucson
 Dante Basco as Gangly Asian
 Ryan Slater as Thin Caucasian 
 Rob Mello as Buford Granger
 Sarah Dumont as Jessica

Sequel

The release date of the third installment of the franchise, titled Bad Asses on the Bayou, was announced in December 2014. The film was released in theatres on March 6, 2015.

References

External links

2014 films
2014 action films
American action films
2010s English-language films
American independent films
American vigilante films
American sequel films
Films set in Los Angeles
Films set in 2016
Films directed by Craig Moss
2010s American films